6-Amyl-α-pyrone, also 6-pentyl-2-pyrone or 6PP, is an unsaturated lactone molecule. It contains two double bonds in the ring and a pentyl substituent at carbon adjacent to the ring oxygen. It is a colorless liquid which possesses characteristic coconut aroma, produced biologically by Trichoderma species. It is found in animal foods, peach (Prunus persica), and heated beef.

Reactivity
Chemically, 6PP is converted into a linear ketone via ring opening and decarboxylation in presence of water, which subsequently undergoes solid base catalyzed aldol condensation reaction into C14/C15 hydrocarbon precursor. Upon heating in presence of Pd/C catalyst with formic acid, the double bonds of the 6PP get reduced to yield the flavoring compound δ-decalactone. In presence of strong reducing agent like lithium aluminium hydride, the double bonds of the ring get saturated and transformed into 1,5-decanediol via sequential hydrogenation steps.

References

External links
 Safety Data Sheet

2-Pyrones